Necydalopsis trizonatus is a species of beetle in the family Cerambycidae, the only species in the genus Necydalopsis.

References

Necydalopsini
Monotypic beetle genera